The Studentendorf Schlachtensee eG was founded in 2002. It is a cooperative based in Berlin that administrates approximately 1,300 residential units for students and scholars at the Studentendorf Schlachtensee, Studentendorf Adlershof and Berlin IBZ sites. The company's headquarter is located in its main site Studentendorf Schlachtensee. The company manages apartments and shared flats for both, local and international students and scholars. According to its statutes, the cooperative promotes the "intercultural, dialogue-oriented and democratically constituted cohabitation students and young scientists from around the world". Preserving the Studentendorf both as national and cultural monument, and as a meeting place, is therefore of particular concern to the co-operative.
In 2014, the company generated EUR 2.7 million and had 36 employees.

History 
 
The cooperative is closely linked to the history of the Studentendorf Schlachtensee, to the fight against the demolition of the property, the sale of the land as well as the student self-administration (SV) of the Studentendorf Schlachtensee. In 2002, the student village Schlachtensee eG was founded with the goal to preserve, renew and manage the Studentendorf Schlachtensee. The foundation of the company was initiated by residents opposed to the Senate of Berlin's plan to demolish the buildings. In the same year the purchase negotiations began with the Liegenschaftsfonds Berlin. The negotiations were completed the following year with purchasing the property. The cooperation gradually began to renew the houses and once again began letting them out for student use. Restoration according to the regulations of the Monument Conservation, of the student village, began in 2006.
 
In 2009 the property was sold to the Swiss Pension Foundation CoOpera Sammelstiftung PUK, with whom a 99-year ground lease was agreed. Since then, the company has focused on the operation and renewal of the Studentendorf, as well as on the development of additional living space for students. Also in 2009, the co-operative took over management of the International Center of Science (IBZ) in Berlin-Wilmersdorf. In October 2014, the Studentendorf Adlershof, on the campus of Humboldt University, was put into operation, following the model of the Studentendorf Schlachtensee as a residential complex for students.

Cooperatives in Germany
Student housing cooperatives
Property management companies
Companies established in 2002